Rush Township is one of the twelve townships of Champaign County, Ohio, United States. The 2010 census reported 2,613 people living in the township, 818 of whom were in the unincorporated portions of the township.

Geography
Located in the northeastern corner of the county, it borders the following townships:
Allen Township, Union County - northeast
Union Township, Union County - east
Goshen Township - south
Union Township - southwest corner
Wayne Township - west
Zane Township, Logan County - northwest

Two villages are located in Rush Township: North Lewisburg in the northwest, and Woodstock in the east.

Name and history
Statewide, other Rush Townships are located in Scioto and Tuscarawas counties.

Rush Township was established in 1828 from land given by Wayne Township.

Government
The township is governed by a three-member board of trustees, who are elected in November of odd-numbered years to a four-year term beginning on the following January 1. Two are elected in the year after the presidential election and one is elected in the year before it. There is also an elected township fiscal officer, who serves a four-year term beginning on April 1 of the year after the election, which is held in November of the year before the presidential election. Vacancies in the fiscal officership or on the board of trustees are filled by the remaining trustees.

References

External links
County website
County and township map of Ohio

Townships in Champaign County, Ohio
Townships in Ohio